Tanasiy Kosovan (born on 3 March 1995) is a Ukrainian football midfielder who plays for Italian club Cavese.

Career 
Kosovan was born in Ukraine but moved to Italy when aged 3.

in 2014 he was swapped with Lorenzo Laverone. On 13 January 2015 he was signed by Lupa Castelli Romani.

On 2 September 2020 he joined Lucchese. On 1 March 2021, his contract was terminated by mutual consent for urgent family reasons. He returned to Picerno for the remainder of the 2020–21 season.

On 14 August 2021 he signed with Cavese in Serie D.

References

External links
 
 

1995 births
Living people
Ukrainian footballers
L.R. Vicenza players
Ukrainian expatriate footballers
Expatriate footballers in Italy
S.S. Racing Club Roma players
S.S.D. Città di Gela players
FC Arsenal Kyiv players
AZ Picerno players
S.S.D. Lucchese 1905 players
Cavese 1919 players
Association football midfielders
Serie C players
Serie D players
Ukrainian First League players